Tashaun Gipson (born August 7, 1990) is an American football free safety for the San Francisco 49ers of the National Football League (NFL). He played college football at Wyoming, and signed with the Cleveland Browns as an undrafted free agent in 2012. He has also played for the Jacksonville Jaguars, Houston Texans and Chicago Bears.

Early years
Gipson was a three-sport star at Kimball High School in Dallas, playing football and basketball while also running track. He had an outstanding career and especially an outstanding senior year on the gridiron. He was named the Most Valuable Player of the 4A District 14 Dallas City League and also earned First Team All-District honors both as a cornerback and as a returner. On defense, Gipson made 35 tackles, broke up nine passes and recovered two fumbles. On offense and special teams, he accumulated more than 1,400 all-purpose yards and scored 14 touchdowns while serving as an offensive team captain. During his career, he played quarterback, wide receiver, free safety and also returned punts and kicks. He was recruited by Baylor, Louisville, Fresno State and Idaho.

College career
Gipson decided to go to the University of Wyoming not only for the chance at early playing time, but also in order to play with his brother, Marcell Gipson. At Wyoming, both Gipson brothers played cornerback from 2008–2010 for the Wyoming Cowboys football team. Gipson's season year in 2011 proved to be his best statistically with 95 total tackles (73 solo 22 assist) with 0.5 sacks, 1 forced fumble, and 3 interceptions. During his senior season, Tashaun started the season by playing at the cornerback position, but for the final 8 games of the season he played at the safety position. Gipson had 3 interceptions as a junior in 2010, and 3 interceptions as a sophomore in 2009. As a freshman Tashaun did not have any interceptions, however along with his brother, Marcell, the Gipson brothers both tied for the team lead in passes defensed with 10 each. Gipson started every game of his collegiate career at Wyoming.

Professional career

Cleveland Browns
On April 29, 2012, the Cleveland Browns signed Gipson to a three-year, $1.44 million contract after he went unselected in the 2012 NFL Draft.

2012
Throughout training camp, Gipson competed for a job as a backup safety against Ray Ventrone, Usama Young, David Sims, and Emanuel Davis. Head coach Pat Shurmur named Gipson the third free safety on the Browns' depth chart to start the regular season, behind veterans Eric Hagg and Ray Ventrone.

He made his professional regular season debut in the Cleveland Browns' season-opener against the Philadelphia Eagles and made his first career tackle on Brandon Boykin during a 29-yard kickoff return in the first quarter of their 17–16 loss. In Week 3, Gipson made six combined tackles during a 24–14 loss against the Buffalo Bills. He earned increased playing time after Eric Hagg had an underwhelming performance in the first two games. The following week, Gipson made two solo tackles before leaving the 23–16 loss in the second quarter after sustaining a knee injury. His injury sidelined him for the next five games (Weeks 5–9). On November 25, 2012, Gipson earned his first career start in place of free safety Usama Young and recorded two solo tackles in a 20–14 win against the Pittsburgh Steelers. The following week, he made his second consecutive start and collected a season-high eight combined tackles during a 20–17 win at the Oakland Raiders. In Week 14, he made two combined tackles, deflected a pass, and recorded his first career interception off a pass by quarterback Brady Quinn in the Browns' 30–7 victory over the Kansas City Chiefs. On December 31, 2012, the Cleveland Browns announced the firing of head coach Pat Shurmur and general manager Tom Heckert after the Browns finished the season with a 5–11 record. He finished his rookie season with 33 combined tackles (26 solo), a pass deflection, and an interception in ten games and three starts.

2013
Gipson entered training camp in 2013 slated as the starting free safety after Usama Young departed during free agency and Eric Hagg was released. He saw minor competition for the role from Johnson Bademosi. New head coach Rob Chudzinski named Gipson the starting free safety to start the regular season, alongside strong safety T. J. Ward.

He started the Cleveland Browns' season-opener against the Miami Dolphins and recorded three solo tackles, broke up a pass, and an interception during a 23–10 loss. In Week 8, Gipson collected a season-high nine solo tackles in the Browns' 23–17 loss at the Kansas City Chiefs. On December 15, 2013, he recorded eight combined tackles, two pass deflections, two interceptions, and returned an interception by Jay Cutler for 44-yard touchdown in Cleveland's 38–31 loss to the Chicago Bears. His touchdown came in the second quarter and marked his first career touchdown. He finished the  season with 95 combined tackles (63 solo), 11 passes defensed, five interceptions, and a touchdown in 16 games and 15 starts. On December 30, 2013, the Cleveland Browns unexpectedly fired head coach Rob Chudzinski after they finished 4–12 in his first and only season as head coach. Gipson finished the season as the 68th ranked safety in Pro Football Focus' overall grades for the 2013 season.

2014
Gipson entered training camp as the Browns' de facto starting free safety. Head coach Mike Pettine named Gipson and newly acquired free agent Donte Whitner the starting safeties to begin the 2014 regular season.

On September 14, 2014, Gipson collected eight combined tackles, broke up a pass, and returned an interception by Drew Brees for a 62-yard touchdown in the Browns' 26–25 victory against the New Orleans Saints. In Week 6, Gipson collected a season-high nine combined tackles as the Browns defeated the Pittsburgh Steelers 31–10. The following week, he made four combined tackles, two pass deflections, and intercepted quarterback Blake Bortles twice in their 24–6 loss at the Jacksonville Jaguars. On November 2, 2014, Gipson made five combined tackles, broke up a pass, and recorded an interception in the Browns' 22–17 win against the Tampa Bay Buccaneers. This marked his third consecutive game with an interception and brought his total to four interceptions in the last three weeks. In Week 12, he collected three combined tackles, but left the Browns' 26–24 win at the Atlanta Falcons in the fourth quarter after colliding with teammate Joe Haden and sustaining a knee injury. On December 20, 2014, the Cleveland Browns placed Gipson on injured reserve for the last two games after he missed the last three games after sustaining damage to his MCL and PCL. He led the league in interceptions at the time of his injury, but would ultimately finish second. On December 23, 2014, it was announced that Gipson was voted to play in the 2015 Pro Bowl, alongside teammates Joe Haden and Joe Thomas. He finished the  season with 52 combined tackles (28 solo), eight pass deflections, a touchdown, and a career-high six interceptions in 11 games and 11 starts.

On January 20, 2015, it was reported that Gipson would have to miss the Pro Bowl due to his knee injury. Gipson was ranked 67th on the NFL Top 100 Players of 2015, as voted on by NFL players.

2015
On March 9, 2015, the Cleveland Browns placed a second round tender on Gipson and agreed to a one-year, $2.56 million contract. Head coach Mike Pettine retained Gipson and Donte Whitner as the starting safety duo entering the 2015 regular season.

He started the Cleveland Browns' season-opener at the New York Jets and recorded five combined tackles, broke up a pass, and intercepted a pass by Geno Smith during their 31-10 loss. He missed three consecutive games (Weeks 5-7) after suffering an ankle injury. On December 20, 2015, Gipson collected a season-high nine combined tackles in the Browns' 30-13 loss at the Seattle Seahawks. Gipson finished the  season with 60 combined tackles (42 solo), two pass deflections, and two interceptions in 13 games and 13 starts.

2016
On January 3, 2016, the Cleveland Browns fired head coach Mike Pettine after they finished fourth in the AFC North with a 3-13 record. Gipson became an unrestricted free agent after the 2015 season and did not receive an offer to remain with the Cleveland Browns.

Jacksonville Jaguars
On March 10, 2016, the Jacksonville Jaguars signed Gipson to a five-year, $36 million contract that includes $12 million guaranteed and a signing bonus of $4 million.

2016
Head coach Gus Bradley named Gipson the starting free safety, alongside starting strong safety Johnathan Cyprien.

In Week 3, Gipson recorded three solo tackles, broke up a pass, and intercepted a pass by Joe Flacco in the Jaguars' 19–17 loss to the Baltimore Ravens. On December 11, 2016, he made a season-high four solo tackles in a 21–20 loss at the Houston Texans. On December 18, 2016, the Jacksonville Jaguars fired head coach Gus Bradley after the Jaguars lost nine consecutive games and accrued a 2–12 record. Assistant head coach and offensive line coach Doug Marrone was appointed the interim head coach for the last two games of the season. On January 1, 2017, Gipson collected a season-high six combined tackles in the Jaguars' 24–20 loss at the Houston Texans. He finished his first season with the Jaguars with 41 combined tackles (34 solo), two pass deflections, and an interception in 16 games and 16 starts.

2017
Head coach Doug Marrone named Gipson the starting free safety to begin the regular season, opposite starting strong safety Barry Church. Marrone became Gipson's fifth head coach as a professional over the span of his first six seasons in the league.

He started the Jacksonville Jaguars' season-opener at the Houston Texans and recorded six combined tackles, two pass deflections, and returned an interception by Deshaun Watson for 67 yards in the fourth quarter of their 29–7 victory. On October 1, 2017, he collected a season-high seven solo tackles and broke up a pass during the Jaguars' 23–20 loss at the New York Jets. The following week, Gipson recorded six combined tackles, two pass deflections, and intercepted two passes by quarterback Ben Roethlisberger as the Jaguars routed the Pittsburgh Steelers 30–9. The Jaguars recorded a total of five interceptions by Roethlisberger during their victory. Gipson finished the  season with 64 combined tackles (53 solo), seven pass deflections, and four interceptions in 16 games and 16 starts. Pro Football Focus gave Gipson an overall grade of 81.4, ranking him 30th among all qualified safeties in 2017.

The Jacksonville Jaguars finished atop the AFC South with a 10–6 record and clinched a playoff berth. On January 7, 2018, Gipson started his first career playoff game and made five solo tackles in a 10–3 victory over the Buffalo Bills in the AFC Wildcard Game. The Jaguars went on to defeat the Pittsburgh Steelers 45–42 in the AFC Divisional round before being eliminated from the playoffs after a 24–20 loss against the New England Patriots in the AFC Championship.

On March 8, 2019, Gipson was released by the Jaguars due to salary cap issues.

Houston Texans
On March 12, 2019, Gipson signed a three-year, $22.55 million contract with the Houston Texans.

Gipson made his debut with the Texans in week 1 against the New Orleans Saints.  In the game, Gipson made 3 tackles in the 30–28 loss. In week 5 against the Atlanta Falcons, Gipson recorded a 79 yard pick six off Matt Ryan in the 53–32 win. In week 6 against the Kansas City Chiefs, Gipson intercepted a pass from Patrick Mahomes in the 31-24 win. In week 14 against the Denver Broncos, Gipson recorded his third interception of the season off a pass thrown by rookie quarterback Drew Lock and returned it 26 yards during the 38–24 loss. He was placed on injured reserve on December 31, 2019.

On April 27, 2020, Gipson was released by the Texans.

Chicago Bears
On May 1, 2020, Gipson signed a one-year deal with the Chicago Bears.

Gipson made his Bears debut in Week 1 against the Detroit Lions. He made 7 tackles in a game the Bears won 27–23. In Week 3 against the Atlanta Falcons, Gipson recorded his first interception as a Bear late in the fourth quarter off a pass thrown by Matt Ryan to secure a 30–26 win. Gipson intercepted Teddy Bridgewater in the first quarter of a Week 6 23–16 win over the Carolina Panthers. In the Wild Card round of the playoffs against the New Orleans Saints, Gipson recorded a strip sack on Taysom Hill that was recovered by the Bears during the 21–9 loss.

On April 20, 2021, Gipson was re-signed by the Bears with a one-year deal.

San Francisco 49ers
On August 22, 2022, Gipson signed a one-year deal with the San Francisco 49ers. He was released on August 30, 2022 and signed to the practice squad the next day. He was promoted to the active roster on September 13, 2022. He started all 17 games, recording 61 tackles, eight passes defensed, and a team-high five interceptions.

On March 12, 2023, Gipson signed a one-year contract extension with the 49ers.

NFL career statistics

Regular season

Postseason

References

External links
Jacksonville Jaguars bio
Cleveland Browns bio
Wyoming Cowboys bio

1990 births
Living people
American football safeties
Chicago Bears players
Cleveland Browns players
Houston Texans players
Jacksonville Jaguars players
San Francisco 49ers players
Players of American football from Dallas
Unconferenced Pro Bowl players
Wyoming Cowboys football players